Mary Whitehead may refer to:

Mary Beth Whitehead, surrogate mother
Mary Whitehead, character in Angel in My Pocket